This is an index of lists of ship commissionings and decommissionings by year. 



Ship commissionings

Ship decommissionings